The second USC&GS Guide was a survey ship that served in the United States Coast and Geodetic Survey from 1941 to 1942.

Guide was built as the civilian yacht Cameco or Comoco by the Defoe Boat and Motor Works at Bay City, Michigan, in 1929. She later was renamed Caronia or Coronia. The United States Navy acquired her in 1941 and transferred her to the Coast and Geodetic Survey, which named her USC&GS Guide.

After conversion for service as a survey ship, Guide entered Coast and Geodetic Survey service in 1941. She did a small amount of hydrographic surveying work in San Francisco Bay, California, before her Coast and Geodetic Survey career was cut short when she was transferred to the U.S. Navy on 16 March 1942 for World War II service under Executive Order 9072 of 24 February 1942.

In the Navy, the ship served as the patrol vessel USS Andradite (PYc-11) until 1945. Sources differ on whether she returned to Coast and Geodetic Survey service in 1947, but she was sold into commercial service in 1952 and operated until destroyed by fire in the Pacific Ocean in 1956.

Notes

References
NOAA History, A Science Odyssey: Tools of the Trade: Ships: Coast and Geodetic Survey Ships: Guide
NavSource.org NavSource Online: Patrol Craft / Gunboat / Submarine Chaser Photo Archive USS Andradite (PYc 11) ex-USC&GS Guide

Ships of the United States Coast and Geodetic Survey
Ships transferred from the United States Navy to the United States Coast and Geodetic Survey
Survey ships of the United States
Ships built in Bay City, Michigan
1929 ships